Barbora Krejčíková (born 18 December 1995) is a Czech professional tennis player. She has a career-high singles ranking of world No. 2, achieved on 28 February 2022, and on 22 October 2018, she became world No. 1 in doubles.

Krejčíková has won one Grand Slam singles title and ten major doubles titles, including the career Super Slam in women's doubles. She won all seven of her women's doubles majors partnering compatriot Kateřina Siniaková. She won all three of her mixed doubles titles at the Australian Open, in 2019 and 2021 with Rajeev Ram and in 2020 with Nikola Mektić. Her singles major win came at the 2021 French Open. She is one of only two active female players to have won a major title in all three disciplines, alongside Venus Williams.

Krejčíková has won six singles and sixteen doubles titles on the WTA Tour, including one at the WTA 1000 level in singles and two in doubles. Alongside her major titles, Krejčíková won the 2021 WTA Finals and a gold medal at the 2020 Tokyo Olympics in women's doubles, both partnering Siniaková, and was part of the Czech team that won the 2018 Fed Cup. The pairing also finished runners-up at two WTA Finals and the 2021 Australian Open.

Personal life and background
Krejčíková started playing tennis aged 6. She later was coached and mentored by Jana Novotná.

Career highlights

Junior years
Krejčíková was ranked junior world No. 3 in October 2013. In that year, she won the girls' doubles titles at the French Open, at Wimbledon and the US Open with fellow Czech Kateřina Siniaková. Alongside Oleksandra Korashvili from Ukraine, she also reached the final of the Australian Open, falling one match shy of completing the calendar-year Grand Slam. The same year, she also won the European Junior Championship U18 in Klosters, Switzerland in singles and doubles.

Professional career highlights

Singles
In October 2020, she reached the fourth round of the French Open tournament, which helped her attain a new best year-end ranking of No. 65 in November.

In March 2021, she made progress to her first singles final of a WTA 1000 tournament at the Dubai Championships, eventually losing to Garbiñe Muguruza. As a result, she climbed to a new career-high of No. 38 in the singles rankings.

In May 2021, she won her first WTA singles title at Strasbourg the day before the 2021 French Open started. Krejčíková went on to win the subsequent French Open, her first Grand Slam final in singles. As a result, she climbed to a career-high of No. 15 in the singles rankings. She won her third WTA singles title at Prague, and reached a career high singles ranking of world number 2 in February 2022 after reaching the final at Sydney and the quarterfinals of the 2022 Australian Open. After injuries, Krejčíková would win two further singles titles in 2022: at Tallinn, and at Ostrava.

She won her maiden WTA 1000 title in singles at the 2023 Dubai Tennis Championships, defeating four top-10 opponents, including the World No. 1, 2, and 3.

Krejčíková has also won 14 singles titles on the ITF Circuit.

Doubles
With compatriot Kateřina Siniaková, she won the doubles titles at the 2018 French Open and 2018 Wimbledon Championships. 
Krejcikova also won the 2021 French Open Women's Doubles title with Siniaková, and they added the Australian Open Women's doubles 2022 title in January 2022.
The pair added the 2022 Wimbledon Championships title and completed the career grand slam with the doubles title in New York at the US Open
 
Krejcikova has won three Grand Slam Mixed Doubles titles, winning the Australian Open for three years in a row from 2019 to 2021. With American partner Rajeev Ram, she won the mixed-doubles competition of the 2019 Australian Open. She succeeded in defending her title the following year alongside Nikola Mektić, and in 2021 again, with Rajeev Ram.

Additionally, Krejčíková has won six more doubles titles on the WTA Tour, one WTA 125K series doubles title, as well as 19 doubles titles on the ITF Circuit.

On 22 October 2018, she reached No. 1 in the doubles rankings, jointly with Kateřina Siniaková. They were the fifth and sixth Czechs ranked No. 1 since 1975, and the 14th pair that attained the No. 1 together.

In August 2021, Krejcikova and Siniaková won the gold medal at the Tokyo Olympics in the women's doubles.

In November 2021, she won the 2021 WTA Finals doubles title with Siniaková, their first title for the year-end championships.

Professional career

2014–15: WTA Tour debut, first WTA title in doubles

Krejčíková made her WTA Tour debut at the Gastein Ladies, where she and partner Kateřina Siniaková lost in the first round. In singles, her debut was at the Tournoi de Québec, where she qualified for the main draw and reached the second round, losing to Lucie Hradecká. In doubles there, she reached the semifinals. At the Luxembourg Open, she reached her first WTA Tour doubles final pairing Hradecká. However, they were defeated by Timea Bacsinszky and Kristina Barrois.
In 2015, Krejčíková only played one WTA Tour main-draw singles event, at the Tournoi de Québec, where she was defeated in the first round. At all four Grand Slam championships, she failed to qualify for the main draw, losing in the first or second rounds of them all.

In doubles, she had more success, reaching the semifinals at the Diamond Games, debuting in the main draw of the French Open, and winning her first title at the Tournoi de Québec. In November, she won her first WTA 125K title at the Open de Limoges, partnering Mandy Minella.

2016: French Open semifinal and top 30 in doubles 

In singles, Krejčíková mainly played on the ITF Circuit. However, she took part in a few WTA tournaments but lost in qualifying or in early rounds of the main draw. She lost in the first round of qualifying at the Qatar Open, Australian Open, and Wimbledon.

Krejčíková started the year well in doubles, reaching the semifinals at the Auckland Open. Next, she played for the first time at the Australian Open, reaching the second round. In February, she played her first Premier final in doubles at the St. Petersburg Trophy. At the Qatar Open, she made her first appearance at a Premier 5/Premier Mandatory tournament, where she lost in the second round. Her breakthrough came at the French Open, where she, with her doubles partner Siniaková, reached the semifinals, losing to Elena Vesnina and Ekaterina Makarova. This result ranked her in the top 50 for the first time, at No. 34. At Wimbledon, she lost in the first round. At the US Open, she reached her second Grand Slam quarterfinal alongside Siniaková, but lost there to Martina Hingis and CoCo Vandeweghe. She entered the top 30 in rankings for the first time in her career.

2017: First WTA singles final

In the first few months, Krejčíková had success in singles on the ITF Circuit, but didn't do well on the WTA Tour. She failed in qualification at Taiwan Open and Morocco Open, and failed to reach the main-draw of Australian Open again, losing in the second round of qualification. Then suddenly, in late May, she reached her first WTA singles final at the Nurember Cup, where she played from the qualifying rounds. She lost the final to top seed Kiki Bertens. This result brought her back to the top 150, for the first time since September 2015. In the grass-court season, she only played in qualifying for Wimbledon, but missed the chance to play in the main-draw. In Bastad, she played in the quarterfinal, where she lost to Caroline Garcia. For the first time, she had the chance to play in the main draw of the Rogers Cup, but lost in the second round of qualification. At US Open, she also didn't have success, losing in the first round of qualification.

Also in doubles, the first few months were not really successful for Krejčíková, reaching only the second round at the Australian Open, and first round of Sydney International, Taiwan Open and Hungarian Open. During the clay-court season, things get better. At Morocco Open, she reached her first semifinal in 2017. At Madrid Open, she lost in the first round, but at the Italian Open she reached her first Premier 5/Premier Mandatory quarterfinal. At the French Open, partnering with Chan Hao-ching, lost to Lucie Hradecká-Kateřina Siniaková in the third round. In the grass season, she only played at Wimbledon, where she lost in the first round. At Swedish Open, she reached the doubles final, but missed the chance to win the title. At Rogers Cup, she lost in the second round of the doubles, while at the US Open, she reached the third round in doubles. In October, she played the semifinal doubles at the Kremlin Cup.

2018: Two Major titles and World No. 1 in doubles 

Unlike previous seasons, Krejčíková now had the chance to play, at least, in singles qualifying rounds at more Premier 5/Premier Mandatory events than before. Unfortunately, she failed to qualify for the main draw at Doha, Indian Wells, Miami and Madrid, but finally qualified at the Rogers Cup, where she lost in the first round. At the majors, she also made a little bit of progress, as she finally made it to the main draw of the French Open after qualifying. In the first round of the main draw, she faced sixth seed Karolína Plíšková but lost. At the US Open, once again, she failed to qualify.

This year was by far the most successful doubles season for Krejčíková to this point. She started well, reaching the final at the Shenzhen Open, where she and Siniaková lost to Romanian combination Irina-Camelia Begu/Simona Halep. At the Australian Open, they reached the third round, Krejcikova’s best result at that tournament. In February, she reached semifinals at the Premier 5 Qatar Open, again with Siniaková. At the Indian Wells Open, they reached the second round. And at the Miami Open, she played her first Premier 5/Mandatory final, but missed the chance to win the title. The clay-court season didn't start so well, reaching only second round of the Madrid Open, and first round of the Italian Open. However, after that, she won her first major doubles title at the French Open. Together with Siniaková, she defeated Japanese pair Eri Hozumi/Makoto Ninomiya in the final. The grass-court season was successful for Krejčíková, reaching the semifinal at the Birmingham Classic, and winning the title at the Wimbledon. At Wimbledon, again with Siniaková, they defeated Květa Peschke and Nicole Melichar in the final, to win a rare Roland Garros/Wimbledon double. After Wimbledon, Krejčíková entered the top 5 in doubles for the first time in her career. The US Open Series was also quite successful. Things started slowly at the Rogers Cup, losing in the second round, but at Cincinnati, she and Siniakova reached the quarterfinals. At the US Open, they were close to reaching a third successive Grand Slam final, but were stopped in the semifinal by Ashleigh Barty and CoCo Vandeweghe. On 22 October, Krejčíková, together with her partner Siniaková, became world No. 1 doubles player. For the first time in her career, Krejčíková had the opportunity to play at the WTA Finals, where she had success. In the first round, Siniaková and Krejčíková defeated Peschke/Melichar, then in semifinals, they defeated Andrea Sestini Hlaváčková/Barbora Strýcová, but unfortunately lost in the final against Tímea Babos/Kristina Mladenovic. Both, Krejčíková and Siniaková finished the year as world-number-1 doubles players. At the end of 2018, they received the award for the 2018 Doubles Team.

2019: Doubles Canadian Open champion
Krejčíková began 2019 playing singles mostly on the ITF Circuit where she had some success. On the WTA Tour, the only tournament where she played in main-draw was Bucharest Open, where she reached quarterfinal. Also, she failed to qualify at Australian Open, French Open, US Open and Rogers Cup.

In doubles, the season started really well for Krejčíková. She played at the Brisbane International, where she reached the semifinals. After that, she finally reached the quarterfinal at the Australian Open, and with that result she completed the set of quarterfinals or better at all four Grand Slam tournaments. At Indian Wells, she entered the final, where she and Siniaková lost to Elise Mertens/Aryna Sabalenka. In Miami, she had less success, losing in the first round. The clay-court season started well, with a quarterfinal at the Madrid Open and semifinal at the Italian Open, but suffered a disappointing loss in the first round of the French Open. Wimbledon was more successful for Krejčíková, reaching the semifinals, where she and Siniaková lost to Gabriela Dabrowski/Xu Yifan.

At the Rogers Cup, she finally won her first Premier 5/Premier Mandatory doubles title. Together with Siniaková, they defeated Anna-Lena Grönefeld/Demi Schuurs in the final, in straight sets. At Cincinnati, she reached the quarterfinal. Krejčíková planned to play in doubles, but during her second-round match in qualifying against Asia Muhammad, Krejčíková was forced to retire. In October, she and Siniakova won the title at the Linz Open. For the second year in row, Krejčíková played at the WTA Finals, again with Siniaková, but they didn't pass the group stage, winning only one match.

Krejčíková also played in mixed-doubles competition, winning her first grand slam mixed doubles title. At the Australian Open, she and American player Rajeev Ram won the title.

2020: Second Mixed doubles Australian Open title
In the COVID-affected 2020 season, Krejčíková finally made progress in singles. For the first time in her career, she qualified for the main draw of the Australian Open, beating Kaia Kanepi before losing to Ekaterina Alexandrova in the second round. 
During the COVID-19 lockdown, Krejčíková took part in Czech tennis tournaments against players like Petra Kvitová and Karolína Muchová. When the tour restarted in August, Krejčíková impressed in a three-set loss to Simona Halep. She returned to the ITF circuit afterwards, where she had a string of disappointing results. This proved to be a turning point, as she later said she was determined to enjoy her singles tennis more. At the French Open in September, Krejčíková had a massive breakthrough, reaching the round of 16. There, she lost to qualifier Nadia Podoroska. She followed with good performances in Ostrava and Linz, where she lost to Victoria Azarenka in the round of 16 and Aryna Sabalenka in the semifinals, respectively. Krejčíková ended the year ranked world No. 65 in singles.

Krejčíková's doubles season started well with a title in Shenzhen over home team Duan Yingying and Zheng Saisai. After that, she played at Australian Open, where she reached the semifinals. In the mixed doubles, she won a second consecutive title, this time with Nikola Mektić. In Dubai, together with Zheng Saisai, Krejčíková lost in the final to Hsieh Su-wei and Barbora Strýcová. In Doha, again with Siniaková, she reached the semifinals before being defeated by Hsieh and Strýcová once again. After the COVID shutdown, Krejčíková returned to play doubles in August, and reached another semifinal at the Prague Open. She returned with Siniaková to the French Open, where they lost in the semifinals to the defending champions Tímea Babos and Kristina Mladenovic.
Krejčíková's 2020 season ended in Ostrava, where she and Siniaková made it to the semifinals before Krejčíková had to withdraw.

2021: French Open titles in singles & doubles, Olympic gold & WTA Finals champion in doubles

Krejčíková began the season ranked world No. 65, and lost in the second round in Abu Dhabi to Yulia Putintseva. She reached the quarterfinals at the Grampians Trophy, beating Lauren Davis and fourth seed Elena Rybakina before losing to Jennifer Brady. While Krejčíková's singles run at the Australian Open was brief, losing in the second round to Ekaterina Alexandrova for the second year in a row, she and Siniaková reached the doubles final but lost to Elise Mertens and Aryna Sabalenka. She won the mixed doubles for the third straight year, returning to partner with Rajeev Ram.

In the Middle East swing, Krejčíková's most notable result in doubles was making the Doha semifinals with Siniaková, before losing to Jeļena Ostapenko and Monica Niculescu. In singles, Krejčíková progressed to the final following wins over Ostapenko, Svetlana Kuznetsova, and 16th seed Maria Sakkari. There, she lost to Garbiñe Muguruza. This result entered Krejčíková into the top 40 in singles for the first time. At the Madrid Open, Krejčíková and Siniaková won the women's doubles title, beating Demi Schuurs and Gaby Dabrowski in the final for their biggest title since Wimbledon in 2018. At Strasbourg, Krejčíková won her maiden singles title, beating Sorana Cîrstea in the final.

At the French Open, Krejčíková defeated Kristýna Plíšková, Ekaterina Alexandrova and Elina Svitolina to reach the fourth round. She then defeated 2018 finalist Sloane Stephens, 6–2, 6–0 to reach her first Grand Slam singles quarterfinal. She there defeated Coco Gauff in straight sets to set up a semifinal with Maria Sakkari, which she won in three sets, saving a match point en route. In her first ever Grand Slam final in only her fifth main draw singles appearance, Krejčíková beat Anastasia Pavlyuchenkova in three sets to claim her first Grand Slam singles title. As a result, she entered the top 15 in singles for the first time in her career. In doubles, Krejčíková and Siniaková beat the Plíšková sisters in an all Czech quarterfinal and Bernarda Pera and Magda Linette in the semifinals. They then defeated Bethanie Mattek-Sands and Iga Świątek in straight sets to claim their second French Open title, and the first singles/doubles sweep in Paris since Mary Pierce in 2000. As a result, Krejčíková & Siniaková reclaimed the No. 1 and No. 2 doubles positions, respectively.

Three weeks later, Krejčíková made her Wimbledon singles debut, where she was seeded for the first time in a Grand Slam. She beat Clara Tauson, Andrea Petkovic and Anastasija Sevastova before losing to the world No. 1 Ashleigh Barty in the fourth round, ending her 15-match winning-streak. She quickly got back to her winning ways, however, claiming the Prague Open over Tereza Martincová in the final. It was her third singles title in four tournaments played. At the 2020 Olympics in July, Krejčíková defeated Zarina Diyas and Leylah Fernandez before losing to Belinda Bencic in the third round. With Siniaková, she won gold in the doubles event, beating Bencic and Viktorija Golubic in the final.

Krejčíková then made her main draw singles debut at the 2021 US Open. She began with straight-sets wins over Astra Sharma, Christina McHale, Kamilla Rakhimova and ninth seed Muguruza to reach her maiden US Open quarterfinal. With an injury sustained in the Murguruza match, Krejčíková was beaten in the quarterfinals by Aryna Sabalenka. On 20 September, Krejčíková reached a new-career high ranking of world No. 5., which was surpassed on 1 November when she reached world No. 3.

Krejčíková represented the Czech Republic in the inaugural 2020-21 Billie Jean King Cup Finals in Prague in November. However, the long season appeared to catch up with her as she lost both of her singles rubbers to Angelique Kerber of Germany and Bencic of Switzerland, and did not play the doubles. One week later, Krejčíková played in the WTA Finals in singles for the first time in her career, and was the first player to do so in both singles and doubles since Karolína Plíšková in 2016. Seeded second, she lost to Muguruza, Plíšková, and Anett Kontaveit during the round robin stage. However, she and Siniaková went unbeaten in the doubles tournament, going undefeated to take the title. With the win over Mertens and Hsieh in the final, Siniaková rose to become the world No. 1, with Krejčíková as No. 2. Krejčíková was awarded the ‘Most Improved Player’ award in the official WTA year-end awards as well as ‘Doubles Team of the Year’ with Siniaková. She ended this breakthrough year as world No. 5 in singles and No. 2 in doubles.

2022: Doubles Career Golden Slam & World No. 2, Two WTA singles titles 
Krejčíková began the season as the third seed at the Sydney International, a WTA 500 event. She defeated Jaqueline Cristian, Caroline Garcia, and fourth seed Anett Kontaveit en route to the final; her match against Kontaveit was particularly remarkable, as she came back from being bagelled in the first set to winning a final-set tiebreak 14–12, saving 7 match points. She lost in the final via another final-set tiebreak to fifth seed Paula Badosa.

As the fourth seed in singles at the 2022 Australian Open, Krejčíková reached the quarterfinals, defeating Andrea Petkovic, Wang Xiyu, 26th seed Jelena Ostapenko, and 24th seed Victoria Azarenka, before losing to Madison Keys. In doubles, she reached the final alongside Siniaková, where they won their fourth major doubles title over Beatriz Haddad Maia and Anna Danilina.

Krejčíková followed up her performance in Australia with two early exits, falling to Dayana Yastremska in the second round of Dubai and Jeļena Ostapenko in the third round of Doha where she was forced to withdraw during a doubles match with Siniaková after injuring her right arm. Despite this setback she reached No. 2 in the world in the WTA singles rankings on 28 February 2022.

Originally scheduled to participate in Indian Wells as the top seed, she pulled out due to the ongoing arm injury that flared up just before the start of the tournament. This injury also kept Krejčíková out of the Miami Open, and forced her to withdraw from all four clay-court tournaments she had signed up for in Stuttgart, Madrid, Rome, and Strasbourg, the latter at which she was the defending champion.

Having not played a match in three months due to an elbow injury, Krejčíková entered the French Open singles draw as the second seed and defending champion. She was upset in the first round by French wildcard Diane Parry; it was only the third time in the history of the event that the defending champion lost in the first round, after Anastasia Myskina in 2005 and Jeļena Ostapenko in 2018. She was later forced to withdraw from the doubles draw as well after testing positive for COVID-19.

Krejcikova's grass court season did not start well with an early loss to Marta Kostyuk at the 2022 Eastbourne International in singles and winning just one match in doubles where she partnered Ena Shibahara. At the 2022 Wimbledon Championships, she reached the third round in singles before losing to Ajla Tomljanović in three sets. 
At the same tournament in doubles, she reached the final with her partner Siniakova and won the title for a second time defeating top seeds Elise Mertens and Zhang Shuai in straight sets.

At the US Open Krejcikova once again lost early in singles, going out in second round to Aleksandra Krunic. However, she was more successful in doubles, where she won the title with Siniaková, coming back from a set down to defeat Taylor Townsend and Caty McNally in the final. With this win Krejcikova and Siniaková completed the Career Golden Slam, and took their third women's doubles Grand Slam title of the year, remaining undefeated in slams in 2022.

Krejcikova returned to the singles court at the inaugural 2022 Tallinn Open and got first ever wins against her first four opponents: Ajla Tomljanovic, Marta Kostyuk, Beatriz Haddad Maia and Belinda Bencic, four players she had never beaten before.
In the final, Krejcikova defeated home favourite Anett Kontaveit in straight sets to win the title. 
A week later, Krejcikova won the title at the 2022 Ostrava Open, her second title in her home country and fifth career singles title. She defeated world number 1, Iga Swiatek in three sets, giving Swiatek her first defeat in a final in three years.
Krejcikova crashed out of the final WTA1000 of the year, the 2022 Guadalajara Open Akron in the first round. She and Siniaková made the semi-finals in the doubles, before losing a match tie-break to Haddad Maia and Danilina.
The pair then played the 2022 WTA Finals - Doubles in Fort Worth, Texas. The Czechs went undefeated in the round robin stage but were defeated in the final by Veronika Kudermetova and Elise Mertens

2023: Australian Open doubles title, maiden WTA 1000 singles title, tenth top-10 win
Krejčíková started her 2023 season at 2023 Adelaide International 2. Having struggled with a left wrist injury since Fort Worth, she lost in the second round to Daria Kasatkina.

At the Australian Open singles tournament, Krejčíková made it to the fourth round but lost to Jessica Pegula. In the Australian Open doubles she reunited with Katerina Siniaková where they won their 24th consecutive grand slam match and their seventh doubles grand slam title and for the first time, defended a major title., Krejčíková's eleventh grand slam title.

She won her first tournament of the season at the 2023 Dubai Tennis Championships defeating five seeds in a row and four top-10 players: 7th seed Daria Kasatkina, 12th seed Petra Kvitová, world No. 2 Aryna Sabalenka, handing her her first defeat of 2023 and ending a 13-match winning streak, world No. 3 Jessica Pegula, for her tenth top-10 win of her career, and finally world No. 1 Iga Świątek, also snapping her 6-match winning streak. This was Krejčíková's maiden WTA 1000 title in singles; with the win, she moved up 14 positions to No. 16, and became just the fifth woman to defeat the world No. 1, 2, and 3 in a single tournament and the only one to do it in three consecutive days.

Playing style
Krejčíkova is an aggressive player, with an all-court game. She is known for her strong serve, powerful groundstrokes, and wholly complete net game. She has been noted for her ability to play with "contained aggression", and to spontaneously inject pace into rallies without notice. As a result, she is capable of generating and redirecting power both crosscourt and down-the-line with both her groundstrokes, allowing her to hit winners, or induce unforced errors from opponents, with a high degree of accuracy. Her two-handed backhand is arguably her strongest groundstroke, with her being able to generate extreme angles with her backhand, and hit winners from any position on the court. Krejčíkova can strategically apply slice to her backhand, continually breaking up the pace of rallies, allowing her to construct points intelligently. Her forehand is also strong, being applied with heavy topspin, pushing opponents far behind the baseline, and allowing her to dictate rallies. She also frequently deploys the sliced forehand, a rare shot in modern tennis, to surprise opponents and aid point construction. Krejčíkova is an exceptional net player due to her doubles experience, and possesses a complete repertoire of shots to perform at the net. Although Krejčíkova typically plays at the baseline until the opportunity arises to attack the net, she occasionally utilises the serve-and-volley tactic to surprise opponents, and win points easily. She also possesses a highly effective drop shot, which typically lands close to the net, surprising opponents in long baseline rallies; if the opponent manages to retrieve the shot, her strong volleying skills allow her to end the point quickly with an aggressive volley, or a perfectly weighted lob., which was instrumental in her defeat of Sakkari in the Roland Garros 2021 semi-final and the winning shot in the 2022 Australian Open doubles final. In the post-match press conference, Krejcikova revealed this was a talent she developed as a junior when the deep lobs would bounce over her shorter opponents’ heads and over the fence!

Despite her aggressive playing style, Krejčíkova possesses excellent movement, speed, stamina, footwork, and court coverage, allowing her to defend to an exceptionally high standard, and she is an effective counterpuncher, extending rallies until she creates the opportunity to hit a winner. Her first serve is strong, peaking at 110 mph (177 km/h), allowing her to serve aces and dictate play from the first stroke. She also possesses strong kick and slice second serves, preventing opponents from scoring free points off her second serve. She is quite prone to aborted ball tosses on serve. On occasion, Krejčíkova does have a tendency to take risks on her second serve, leading to a relatively high double fault count. Due to her aggressive mindset and defensive abilities, Krejčíkova is a dangerous opponent on all surfaces, although her strongest surface is clay, where the high bounce and slow pace allow her to execute her playing style perfectly.

Endorsements
Krejčíková signed an endorsement deal in 2022 with Fila for clothing, footwear, and apparel. She is endorsed by Head for racquets, specifically using the Head Extreme racquet; she was previously sponsored by Head for clothing and footwear, until switching to Fila. She is also sponsored by Roko-Motor, the Czech division of Jaguar Land Rover.

Career statistics

Grand Slam tournament performance timelines

Singles

Doubles

Mixed doubles

Grand Slam finals

Singles: 1 (1 title)

Doubles: 8 (7 titles, 1 runner-up)

Mixed doubles: 3 (3 titles)

Olympic finals

Doubles: 1 (gold medal)

Year-end championships finals

Doubles: 3 (1 title, 2 runner-ups)

References

External links

 
 
 
 
 
 
 

1995 births
Living people
Sportspeople from Brno
Czech female tennis players
French Open junior champions
Wimbledon junior champions
US Open (tennis) junior champions
Grand Slam (tennis) champions in women's singles
Grand Slam (tennis) champions in girls' doubles
Grand Slam (tennis) champions in women's doubles
French Open champions
Wimbledon champions
Australian Open (tennis) champions
Grand Slam (tennis) champions in mixed doubles
Olympic tennis players of the Czech Republic
Tennis players at the 2020 Summer Olympics
Olympic gold medalists for the Czech Republic
Medalists at the 2020 Summer Olympics
Olympic medalists in tennis
WTA number 1 ranked doubles tennis players
ITF World Champions